Mount Haig-Brown is a mountain on Vancouver Island, British Columbia, Canada, located  east of Gold River and  south of Mount Filberg. The peak, at the north end of Buttle Lake, commemorates noted author and conservationist Roderick Haig-Brown and his wife Anne.

See also
List of mountains of Canada

References

Vancouver Island Ranges
One-thousanders of British Columbia
Nootka Land District